Banksia serra, commonly known as serrate-leaved dryandra, is a species of shrub that is endemic to Western Australia. It has broadly linear, serrated leaves, pale yellow flowers in heads of about thirty and egg-shaped follicles.

Description
Banksia serra is a shrub that typically grows to a height of  but does not form a lignotuber. There are between eight and twenty broadly triangular serrations on each side of the leaves.

Taxonomy and naming
This species was first formally described in 1830 by Robert Brown who gave it the name Dryandra serra and published the description in the Supplementum primum Prodromi florae Novae Hollandiae from specimens collected by William Baxter near King George's Sound in 1829. The specific epithet (serra) is a Latin word meaning "saw", referring to the leaves.

In 2007, Austin Mast and Kevin Thiele transferred all the dryandras to the genus Banksia and this species became Banksia serra.

Distribution and habitat
Banksia serra grows in woodland, forest and mallee-kwongan from the Bow River to Mount Manypeaks.

Ecology
An assessment of the potential impact of climate change on this species found that its range is likely to contract by between 30% and 80% by 2080, depending on the severity of the change.

Conservation status
This banksia is classified as "not threatened" by the Western Australian Government Department of Parks and Wildlife.

References

 

serra
Plants described in 1830
Taxa named by Robert Brown (botanist, born 1773)